Angophora costata subsp. costata is a species of medium-sized to large tree that is endemic to eastern Australia. It has smooth bark, lance-shaped adult leaves, flower buds in groups of three, white or creamy white flowers and cylindrical to barrel-shaped fruit. It is similar to subspecies costata but has narrower leaves and smaller fruit.

Description
It has smooth pinkish to orange bark that weathers to grey. Flowering occurs from October to December.

Taxonomy and naming
Metrosideros costata was first formally described in 1788 by Joseph Gaertner. In 1916 James Britten changed the name to Angophora costata and in 1986 Gregory John Leach described three subspecies, including subspecies costata.

Distribution and habitat
This eucalypt subspecies grows in sandy soil, often over sandstone and occurs naturally in Queensland and New South Wales. It is widely distributed in south-eastern Queensland and disjunctly in the White Mountains National Park. In New South Wales it mainly occurs in coastal areas south from Coffs Harbour to Narooma and as far west as the Blue Mountains. In Victoria it is a commonly planted ornamental and is naturalised in some places.

References

costata
Flora of New South Wales
Trees of Australia
Plants described in 1986